GRK Tikveš , formerly known as GRK Lozari, is a handball club from Kavadarci, North Macedonia. Tikves is a member of the VIP Super league.

History
The Tikves Club was established in 1955 by the Tikves Sports Association. The first coach was Lazar Lalkov, the initiators of the formation of the club besides Lalkov were also Gjoko Mukaetov and Dobre Stavrov, founders of the handball game in Kavadarci. Tikves  played their first season in the  1955 Championship  when they finished second  behind Rabotnichki. 
 
The club was three times champion of Macedonia (1962, 1964, 1975), three times winner of the Macedonian Cup (1958, 1963 and 1970). Tikves also played in the Second League in the former Federal league  when in its first appearance in 1971 placed at the  seventh place. Tikves also played in the Inter-Republic League in the 1980–81 season, winning second place.

Notable players from this period were Pane Malinkov, brothers Simon and Jovan Kjurchievi, Jordan Ilkov, brothers Angjushevi, Miodrag Micajkov, Zarkov, Zafirov, the goalkeeper Rizov, Kamchev, Maslarkov.

They  competed in the First League, second tier handball league. They won the championship in season 2019-20 and qualified for the VIP Super League. This season they compete in the Top Division.

Home ground
Jasmin Sports Arena is a multi-purpose indoor sports arena located in Kavadarci,  Macedonia and seats 3,500 spectators.

The arena is used for basketball by KK Feni Industries.In May 2011, it hosted the Final Four of the Balkan International Basketball League. It has also been used for concerts and handball by GRK Tikveš.

Accomplishment  

 Macedonian Champions  
(3) 1962,1964,1976

Cup Winners
(3) 1958,1963,1970

Team

Squad for the 2021–22 season

References
 Македонска Ракометна Супер Лига

External links
RFM Profile
EHF Profile
Macedonian Handball Federation 

Kavadarci
Sport in Kavadarci